The Bydgoszcz Raiders were an American football team based in Bydgoszcz, Poland That played in the 2nd division of the Polish American Football League.

History
The origins of American football in Bydgoszcz back to 2008, when it began to create a team called Bydgoszcz Raiders. In 2009 the team changed his name to Bydgoszcz Archers. In 2012 some players of the Archers founded a new team called Bydgoszcz Raiders.

Season-by-season records

PLFA

References

American football teams in Poland
Sport in Bydgoszcz
American football teams established in 2012
American football teams disestablished in 2013
2012 disestablishments in Poland
2013 disestablishments in Poland